Full Circle, released in 2006, is the sixth album from West Coast rapper Xzibit, his first release on Koch Records. To assist in the making of Full Circle, Xzibit enlisted Keith Shocklee of the Bomb Squad as co-executive producer. The Game, DJ Quik, Too Short, T-Pain and Tha Dogg Pound make up the many high-profile guests, and the Chappelle's Show'''s Donnell Rawlings makes a comedic appearance.

"Concentrate" was released as the lead single. Produced by the Bay Area's Rick Rock, it sampled and looped "Nam Myōhō Renge Kyō," a mantra that is chanted as the central practice of all forms of Nichiren Buddhism.Full Circle debuted at number 50 on the Billboard 200 with first-week sales of 17,000 copies in the US. Since then It has now sold 122,000 copies in the US and 244,000 copies worldwide. The album had three singles released, in which two of them had music videos filmed for them (for "Concentrate" and "Thank You").

Track listing

Sample credits
 "Family Values" contains samples of "Savoir Faire''", performed originally by Chic.

Chart positions

References

External links
 Full Circle lyrics at XzibitCentral.com

2006 albums
E1 Music albums
Xzibit albums
Albums produced by DJ Khalil
Albums produced by DJ Quik
Albums produced by JellyRoll
Albums produced by Warryn Campbell